Timothy Beson is an American Republican politician from Michigan. He was elected to the Michigan House of Representatives from the 96th district in 2020, defeating incumbent State Representative Brian Elder. Formally serving on the Bangor Township Schools Board of Education, Beson also owned and operated Beson's Market.

References 

Living people
Year of birth missing (living people)
21st-century American politicians
Republican Party members of the Michigan House of Representatives
Place of birth missing (living people)